The 1994 Southwest Conference men's basketball tournament was held March 11–0, 1994, at Reunion Arena in Dallas, Texas. 

Number 1 seed Texas defeated 2 seed  87-62 to win their 1st championship and receive the conference's automatic bid to the 1994 NCAA tournament.

Format and seeding 
The tournament consisted of the top 8 teams playing in a single-elimination tournament.

Tournament

References 

1993–94 Southwest Conference men's basketball season
Basketball in the Dallas–Fort Worth metroplex
Southwest Conference men's basketball tournament